The Smart Forspeed is a concept car first shown to the public at the 2011 Geneva Motor Show by the Smart division of Daimler AG.

It is a two-seater electric roadster, powered by a rear-mounted  electric motor with a  overboost function.

Charging of the power cell is by a 220 volt port which is located between the rear light clusters, and can be charged to 80% in 45 minutes. The design of the Forspeed includes solar cells incorporated into the wind deflector.

References

Forspeed
Concept cars